Percival Spencer Umfreville (Spencer) Pickering (6 March 1858 – 5 December 1920) was a British chemist and horticulturist.

Born to Anne Maria Spencer-Stanhope and her husband Percival Pickering, Pickering grew up in a wealthy family, and was able to start a career in science by building his own laboratory in his private house. In 1881, he took up a position as lecturer at Bedford College, where he stayed until 1887. After losing an eye in a serious accident in his lab, his health waned and he moved to the countryside to the village of Harpenden. Among the residents of the village were already four fellows of the Royal Society, and Pickering was to become the fifth by 1890. 

From 1894 on, he was director of the Woburn Experimental Fruit Farm, a private establishment by Pickering and the Duke of Bedford, where he worked to improve horticultural techniques.

In 1907, he discovered the phenomenon that emulsions can be stabilised by small particles instead of emulsifiers, nowadays referred to as Pickering stabilization, although the effect was already recognized by Walter Ramsden in 1903.

Literature
E.J. Russell, "Obituary notice: Percival Spencer Umfreville Pickering", Biochemical Journal 15, 1–3 (1921).  
S.U. Pickering, "Emulsions", Journal of the Chemical Society 91, 2001-2021 (1907).
W. Ramsden, Proceedings of the Royal Society (London) B 72, 156-164 (1903).

1858 births
1920 deaths
English chemists
Fellows of the Royal Society